Boneh Sur (also Romanized as Boneh Sūr) is a village in Jowzar Rural District, in the Central District of Mamasani County, Fars Province, Iran. At the 2006 census, its population was 17, in 4 families.

References 

Populated places in Mamasani County